Spiritual exercises may refer to:

 Any spiritual practice dedicated towards increasing one's personal spiritual capacity
 Spiritual Exercises of Ignatius of Loyola, a book of spiritual practices of the Roman Catholic Jesuit order